Mordkommission Istanbul (Istanbul Homicide Unit) is a German television series.

Plot 
Istanbul police inspector Mehmet Özakin is in charge of murder investigations, mostly in the Turkish city. A very modern Turk, he uses up to date Western methods, without prejudice, assisted by Mustafa Tombul. Even his private life is progressive, his wife Sevim being on the former imperial capital's university staff.

See also
List of German television series

External links
 

2008 German television series debuts
2010s German television series
German crime television series
2000s German police procedural television series
2010s German police procedural television series
2020s German police procedural television series
Television shows set in Turkey
German-language television shows
Das Erste original programming